Alex Frew (24 October 1877 – 29 April 1947) was an international rugby union forward who played for both Scotland and South Africa.

Amateur career

He played for Kilmarnock RFC before moving to Edinburgh University.

He was capped by Scotland while at Edinburgh University RFC. He graduated as a doctor.

In South Africa, he played for Diggers RFC. He came to South Africa to work in a British-run concentration camp as a doctor.

Provincial career

He was capped for the South-West District before being capped for Glasgow District to play in the 1899 Inter-city match against Edinburgh District.

While at Kilmarnock, he was also capped for West Counties District.

When he moved to South Africa he played for Transvaal province.

International career

Frew played three tests for Scotland and one test for South Africa, captaining them on that one occasion

References

1877 births
1947 deaths
Alumni of the University of Edinburgh
Edinburgh University RFC players
Glasgow District (rugby union) players
Kilmarnock RFC players
Rugby union forwards
Rugby union players from East Ayrshire
Scotland international rugby union players
Scottish rugby union players
South Africa international rugby union players
South African people of British descent
South African rugby union players